Aethaloessa rufula is a moth in the family Crambidae. It was described by Whalley in 1961. It is found on the Solomon Islands.

References

Moths described in 1961
Spilomelinae
Moths of Oceania